Government College, Zirapur is a degree college in Jirapur, Madhya Pradesh affiliated to Barkatullah University, Bhopal

Courses
Following courses are available,
 B.A.
Affiliated to:  Barkatullah University, Bhopal
Duration:  3 Years
 B.Com.
Affiliated to:  Barkatullah University, Bhopal
Duration:  3 Years
 B.Sc. Science
Affiliated to:  Barkatullah University, Bhopal
Duration:  3 Years
 M.A. Economics
Affiliated to:  Barkatullah University, Bhopal
Duration:  2 Years
 M.A. Political Science
Affiliated to:  Barkatullah University, Bhopal
Duration:  2 Years

References

Government universities and colleges in India
Universities and colleges in Madhya Pradesh
Rajgarh district